Der Prins muß her is a German television series.

See also
List of German television series

1987 German television series debuts
1987 German television series endings
German crime television series
German-language television shows
Das Erste original programming